Jutiapa is a municipality in the Honduran department of Atlántida.

Demographics 
2010 Population by Age:

References

External links
 MUNICIPIO DE JUTIAPA - SECRETARÍA DE GOBERNACIÓN Y JUSTICIA 

Municipalities of the Atlántida Department